Friday Kasteni (born 25 March 1988) is a Zimbabwean cricketer. He is a left-handed aggressive batsman.

He scored a century on his first-class debut for Midlands against Matabeleland in April 2005. He went on to represent Zimbabwe at the Under-19 World Cup in Sri Lanka in 2006. Kasteni made his One Day International debut in February 2007, against Bangladesh.

Kasteni was then selected in Zimbabwe's 2007 World Cup squad. He was the only surprise inclusion, with the veteran of 15 Tests, Hamilton Masakadza, left out. In his first World Cup innings, Kasteni was out for a golden duck.

In a controversial move by the selectors, Kasteni replaced Terrence Duffin, one of the team's most experienced players, for Zimbabwe's final two World Cup games. The move did not pay off, and Kasteni scored just 9 runs at an average of 4.50.

In 2008, Kasteni was chosen by the Zimbabwe Cricket Board to attend a six-week course at Cricket Australia's Centre of Excellence in Brisbane and in 2012 moved to Canberra, Australia on a sports scholarship to qualify for permanent residency of Australia with the intention of playing first-class cricket in Australia.

References

External links
 
 Friday Kastei Interview

1988 births
Living people
Zimbabwean cricketers
Midlands cricketers
Zimbabwe One Day International cricketers
Centrals cricketers
Alumni of Eaglesvale High School
Mid West Rhinos cricketers
Sportspeople from Kadoma, Zimbabwe